Eşref Armağan (born 1953) is a blind painter of Turkish origin. Born without sight to an impoverished family, he taught himself to write and print. He has painted using oil paints for roughly thirty-five years.

Using a braille stylus to etch the outline of his drawing, Armağan requires total silence to create art. Oil paint is then applied with his fingers and left to dry fully before a new color is applied. This unique method is used so that colors do not smudge. The art pieces themselves are created without help from any individual.  He is also able to create art that has visual perspective. In 2004, he was the subject of a study of human perception, conducted by the psychologist John M. Kennedy of University of Toronto and proved that a person who is blind from birth can develop absolutely normally without visual contact with the outside world. In 2008 two researchers from Harvard, Amir Amedi and Alvaro Pascual-Leone, tried to find more about neuroplasticity using Armağan as a study case.
Both scientists had evidence that in cases of blindness, the "visual" cortex acts differently from how it acts with the non-blind. Pascual-Leone has found that Braille readers use  this very same area for touch. Amedi, together (with Ehud Zohary) at the Hebrew University in Jerusalem, found that the area is also activated in verbal memory tasks. When Amedi analyzed the results, however, he found that Armağan's visual cortex lit up during the drawing task, but hardly at all for verbal recall, meaning that some unused visual areas might be used in collaboration with ones needs from the brain.
Moreover, in scans that were held while Armağan drew, his visual cortex signals seemed as he was seeing to the extent that a naive viewer of his scan might assume Armağan really could see.

Armağan is married and has two children. He has displayed his work at more than 20 exhibitions in Turkey, Italy, China, the Netherlands and the Czech Republic. He has appeared several times on television and in the press in Turkey and has been on programs on Al Jazeera, BBC and ZD.

In 2009 Armağan was invited by Volvo to paint the new model S60 as part of a social media campaign. His work was documented in a series of videos posted on Volvo's Facebook page.  The resulting painting of the S60 sold on eBay for US$3,050. The Canadian non-profit charity organization World Blind Union (WBU) was the benefactor of the auction.

Notes

Sources
 Official Sites    http://www.esrefarmagan.com,  http://www.armagan.com/
 Senses special: The art of seeing without sight The New Scientist  29 January 2005 https://www.newscientist.com/channel/being-human/mg18524841.700
 Kennedy, John's study at the University of Toronto.
 Слепой художник Эшреф Армаган
 Esref Armagan: History, photographs, how to buy his art. Also links to science journals, articles, and videos.
 Tobias Teutenberg: Bilder aus der Dunkelheit. Zum sichtbar Taktilen in der Kunst Eşref Armağans, 2013

Further reading 
John Kennedy's Drawing and the Blind (New Haven: Yale UP, 1993).
Burk, Rachelle. Painting in the Dark: Esref Armagan, Blind Artist. Boston: Tumblehome Learning, 2016. This illustrated print picture book will also be available in braille and audio by 2017.
 How a blind artist is challenging our understanding of colour. The Conversation (2018) Dr Simon Hayhoe writes about the achievements of Esref Armagan
Website: http://esrefarmagan.blogspot.com/  (A comprehensive website with links to articles, books, videos, and photos).

Blind artists
20th-century Turkish painters
1953 births
Living people
Artists from Istanbul
Turkish blind people
21st-century Turkish painters
Turkish male painters
20th-century Turkish male artists
21st-century Turkish male artists